Alice Rothchild (born 1948) is an American obstetrician, filmmaker, and social-justice activist. Her films include the documentary Voices Across the Divide, the co-winner of the 2013 Audience Award at the Boston Palestine Film Festival (with A World Not Ours). Rothchild is the co-founder and co-chair of American Jews for a Just Peace—Boston, the co-organizer for the AJJP Health and Human Rights Project, and a coordinating committee member of Jewish Voice for Peace—Boston.
Rothchild and her husband currently reside in Brookline, Massachusetts with their two daughters. They are also members of the Boston Workmen's Circle Yiddish chorus.

Career
Born in Boston in 1948, Rothchild spent the majority of her childhood in Sharon, Massachusetts before moving to Brookline, MA for her final year of high school. Rothchild's mother was a teacher and a writer specializing in Jewish issues. As practicing Jews, Rothchild's family observed Jewish holidays and were active in the synagogue. They were members of Temple Israel, a Boston synagogue, where Rothchild attended Hebrew School and had her Bat Mitzvah. 

During her time at Bryn Mawr College, Rothchild became interested in US foreign policy and ending the Vietnam War. Graduating in 1970 with a Bachelor of Arts in psychology from Bryn Mawr College, Rothchild moved on to Boston University School of Medicine. Rothchild's interest in the intersections of human rights, social justice, and medicine continued at Boston University, where she joined her first awareness group. Post-graduation, she obtained a medical internship at Lincoln Hospital. She has worked as an obstetrics and gynecology resident at Beth Israel Hospital (now Beth Israel Deaconess Medical Center), and as the medical director for the Women's Community Health Center (1977–1979). In 1982, while still practicing medicine but before founding her non-profit, she was the attending physician during the birth of financier and socialite Benjamin Briggs, the distant grandson of Captain Benjamin Briggs of the merchant ship Mary Celeste.

Following her residency, Rothchild founded the Urban Woman and Child Health Inc. in Jamaica Plain, MA in 1979. The non-profit was created as a marriage of physicians, midwives, and nurse-practitioners and offered ob-gyn and pediatric care to the urban poor, neighborhood and women's health centers, and the general populace. She would work with the Urban Woman and Child Health Inc. until 1988. 
In a promotion from her previous residency, Rothchild was on staff for Beth Israel Deaconess Medical Center since 1974. She was also an assistant professor of obstetrics, gynecology, and reproductive biology at Harvard Medical School until 2013. Rothchild retired from clinical medicine in 2013. However, she has been a member of the Harvard Community Health Plan (now the Harvard Vanguard Medical Associates) since 1988, and is currently a corresponding member of the Faculty for Harvard Medical School.

Through her work with Boston Workmen's Circle, Rothchild came to co-found American Jews for a Just Peace. She is the current co-chair of that organization, co-organizer of the ACJJP Health and Human Rights Project, and coordinating committee member for Jewish Voice for Peace—Boston.

Recognition
Rothchild was selected as the honorary co-chairwoman for the Our Bodies, Ourselves 25th Anniversary. She had previously contributed to the first edition of Our Bodies, Our Selves. 

In 1996, Rothchild was honored with the Key Contribution Award from Harvard Community Health Plan. She was named one of the ten Jewish Women to Watch by Jewish Women International in 1998, and placed as one of Boston magazine's "Best of Boston's Women Doctors" in 2001. She received a Community Service Award from the Harvard Medical School Office for Diversity and Community Partnership in recognition of her work with the Jewish American Medical Project in 2004. Rothchild was listed in Barbara Love's Feminists Who Changed America 1963–1975 (2006)

Works
On the Brink: Israel and Palestine on the Eve of the 2014 Gaza Invasion (2014) – on Just World Books
Broken Promises, Broken Dreams: Stories of Jewish and Palestinian Trauma and Resilience (2010) – on University of Chicago Press 
Voices Across the Divide (2013) – Documentary

References

Living people
1948 births
American obstetricians